Boys State is a 2020 American documentary film directed and produced by Jesse Moss and Amanda McBaine. It follows a thousand teenage boys attending Boys State in Texas, coming to build a representative government from the ground up.

The film had its world premiere at the Sundance Film Festival on January 24, 2020, where it won the U.S. Documentary Competition Grand Jury Prize. It was released on Apple TV+ on August 14, 2020, by A24 and Apple.

Cast 
The film focuses on four participants in the program:

 Ben Feinstein, a crafty white boy from San Antonio and bilateral amputee with conservative views who runs for Federalist Party State Chairman
 Robert MacDougall, a jockish, jocular white boy from Austin with moderate views who runs for Nationalist Party Governor
 Steven Garza, a soft-spoken Hispanic boy from a working-class family with progressive views who runs for Nationalist Party Governor
 René Otero, a highly charismatic black boy from Chicago with progressive views who runs for Nationalist Party State Chairman

Other participants, such as Eddy Proietti Conti, who runs for Federalist Party Governor, also make appearances.

Synopsis
The film follows a thousand teenage boys attending Boys State in Austin, Texas, coming together to build a representative government from the ground up, from all different political backgrounds, navigating challenges of organizing political parties, consensus, and campaigning for the highest office at Boys State, Governor of Texas.

The boys arrive for the program, where they are randomly divided into two parties, the Nationalists and Federalists. Those wishing to run for governor seek to collect 30 signatures to get on the primary ballot. MacDougall does so easily; Garza manages to reach the threshold just before the deadline. Otero delivers a powerful speech and is elected state chairman for the Nationalists; he is subject to an impeachment motion that easily fails. Feinstein is elected state chairman for the Federalists. In primary campaigning, Garza delivers a sincere speech, but questions arise among conservative voters about his past participation in March for Our Lives, as well as his views on abortion and immigration policies. MacDougall positions himself as a conservative, hiding his true beliefs, but he comes across as less passionate and loses the race to Garza.

Meanwhile, the Federalists have elected Conti as their gubernatorial candidate. In the general election, the Federalists launch a humorous Instagram attack page. However, the party dissociates itself from it after it makes a racist attack on Otero. Garza appears on the verge of victory, prompting Feinstein to engineer a scandal. He tells Conti to try to conduct a Q&A during a forum moderated by Otero, a minor rule violation. When Otero disallows it, he latches onto that fact and accuses Otero of bias in later forums. As the program concludes, the boys cast their votes, and Conti is elected governor.

Release

The film had its world premiere at the Sundance Film Festival on January 24, 2020. Shortly after, A24 and Apple acquired distribution rights to the film for $12 million. The film was set to screen at South by Southwest on March 13, 2020, but the festival was cancelled due to the COVID-19 pandemic. It was released on Apple TV+ on August 14, 2020, after its UK release at Sundance London 2020 Online on August 9.

Reception

Critical response 
The website's critics consensus reads: "Startling, upsetting, and overall absorbing, Boys State strikingly depicts American political divisions -- and machinations -- taking root in the next generation." On Metacritic, the film has a weighted average score of 84 out of 100, based on 32 critics, indicating "universal acclaim".

Accolades 
At the 2020 Sundance Film Festival, the film won the U.S. Documentary Competition Grand Jury Prize. At South by Southwest, the film won the Louis Black Lone Star Award Special Jury Recognition for Documentary.

References

External links

''Boys State on Apple TV+

2020 films
A24 (company) films
American documentary films about politics
Apple TV+ original films
Documentary films about American politics
Sundance Film Festival award winners
2020 independent films
2020s English-language films
Primetime Emmy Award-winning broadcasts
2020s American films